Kwang Hwa Chung (born 1948) is a South Korean physicist who has served as president of the Korea Research Institute of Standards and Science and the president of the Institute for Basic Science. She has received the Moran Medal of the Order of Civil Merit, as well as other honors and awards for her scientific research and work to promote professionalism for women in STEM fields.

Early life and education
After graduating from Gyeonggi Girls' High School in 1966, Chung studied physics at Seoul National University, completing her undergraduate studies in 1970. Continuing her education, she earned a PhD in the field of particle physics from the University of Pittsburgh in Pennsylvania in 1977. Her dissertation was titled, Chiral calculations of the phase shifts for the π, K system. While in Pittsburgh, she married her classmate, Kyungsoo Jeong, a fellow physicist who would go on to work researching missiles at the Defense Science Research Institute in Seoul.

Career
In 1978, Chung began researching at the Korea Standards Research Institute, later the Korea Research Institute of Standards and Science, the first woman to work as a doctoral researcher at the institute.  For a decade, she would be one of only two women scientists working there. Her specialty is in vacuum measurements. She was appointed the head of the mass standard laboratory and later of the pressure and vacuum laboratory. She has recorded domestic patents for numerous devices, including a plasma electron density measurement and monitor, as well as overseas patents, including a gas flow velocity distribution analyzer and is recognized as an expert in measurement standards.

Two years later they founded a daycare center for the Daedeok Innopolis to help working women with balancing their work and home obligations. During her years as president of the association, Chung pressed for legislation to encourage the participation of women in Science, technology, engineering, and mathematics disciplines. In 2002, the Act on Fostering and Supporting Women Scientists and Engineers passed the legislature and at the end of the year, she was awarded the Science and Technology Grand Prize by the National Assembly for her work to create the law.

In 2000, Chung was honored with the Moran Medal of the Order of Civil Merit and received the Scientific Engineer of the Month award in October 2004 for developing evaluation technology for vacuum characteristics. In 2005 she became the first woman to serve as president of the Korea Research Institute of Standards and Science, and served a three year term. In 2008, she was chosen by the Korea Science Foundation and the Ministry of Education, Science and Technology as the Female Scientist of the Year and was elected to membership in the International Committee for Weights and Measures headquartered in France. From 2009 to 2013, she was president of the Graduate School of Analytical Science and Technology of Chungnam National University and was elected to serve a 3 year term as president of the Korea Basic Science Institute in 2013.

Selected works

References

Citations

Bibliography

 

1948 births
Living people
Seoul National University alumni
University of Pittsburgh alumni
South Korean physicists
20th-century physicists
21st-century physicists
20th-century South Korean scientists
21st-century South Korean scientists
20th-century women scientists
21st-century women scientists
South Korean women scientists
Women physicists
Academic staff of Chungnam National University
Academic staff of Kyung Hee University